Greatest Hits is a 1996 compilation album from the British musician Joe Jackson. The album is part of the Backlot series from A&M Records featuring newly designed artwork, digital remastering, unreleased tracks and extensive liner notes. Tracks include the hits "Is She Really Going Out with Him?", "It's Different for Girls", "Steppin' Out" and "You Can't Get What You Want (Till You Know What You Want)", plus live versions of "A Slow Song" and "Memphis".

Track listing

References

1996 greatest hits albums
Joe Jackson (musician) albums
A&M Records compilation albums